The Vance C. Larmore House is a historic residence near Hammondville, Alabama.  Larmore came to DeKalb County from Abingdon, Virginia, around 1838.  One of the earliest white settlers in the county following the Cherokee removal, he built one of the largest farms in the mountainous area, amassing 1700 acres (690 ha) by 1860.  In the mid-1840s, Larmore built a two-story I-house, a Vernacular form brought from the East to what was then the frontier.  The house is clad in clapboard, and has a Victorian-detailed front porch, which was a later addition.  The interior has a center-hall plan on each floor, as well as a one-story ell off the rear, containing a kitchen and dining room.  The house was listed on the Alabama Register of Landmarks and Heritage in 1979 and the National Register of Historic Places in 2004.

References

National Register of Historic Places in DeKalb County, Alabama
Houses on the National Register of Historic Places in Alabama
Houses completed in 1845
Houses in DeKalb County, Alabama
Properties on the Alabama Register of Landmarks and Heritage